Dravidar Kazhagam is a social movement founded by E. V. Ramasami, also called Thanthai Periyar. Its original goals were to eradicate the ills of the existing caste system including untouchability and on a grander scale to obtain a "Dravida Nadu" (Dravidian nation) from the Madras Presidency. Dravidar Kazhagam would in turn give birth to many other political parties including Dravida Munnetra Kazhagam and later the All India Anna Dravida Munnetra Kazhagam.

History 
Founded by Periyar E. V. Ramasamy, the roots of the Dravidar Kazhagam lie in the Self-Respect Movement and Justice Party. Periyar formed the Self-Respect Movement in 1925, breaking in the process from the Indian National Congress party, of which he had been a member until then. The Justice Party, formed in 1917, also claimed to promote similar interests. The two entities merged in 1938 under Periyar's leadership. The name was changed to Dravidar Kazhagam in 1944.

Ideology
Being completely opposed to Brahminical social, political and ritual dominance of southern India, the primary purpose of the Dravida Kazhagam was to secure the complete independence of a Dravidian Republic (Dravida Nadu). The party at its inception retained similar values to the Justice Party which had the views of a traditional type of balance signifying the idea of equality. Being heavily influenced by Periyar's Self-Respect Movement, it also adopted many of its goals and objectives. A few of these similarities were to eliminate the caste, class, and creed divide amongst people to foster a balanced society, working towards the elimination of inequality and ensuring that men and women have equal opportunities towards all aspects of life, and pushing for the eradication of superstitious beliefs based on religion.

Conflict years
As the party gained prominence, many in the party wanted to contest in the elections including C. N. Annadurai. However, Periyar argued that politics would force ideology to the background. With a straining relationship in the organization and Periyar marrying Maniyammai, who was more than 40 years younger than him, some members of the party broke apart and formed the Dravida Munnetra Kazhagam. Periyar marrying a girl of younger age caused strains within organization and outside it. The organization was headed by Maniammai and later by K.Veeramani after her demise.

Presidents

Later years
Periyar's protests were largely symbolic and did not call for the destruction of private property or physically harming anyone. It based its interests on anti-Hindi and anti-Brahmin agitations and never became a full-fledged political party.

Dravidar Kazhagam Flag 

The flag of Dravidar Kazhagam can trace its origins back to 1937. During that year, Hindi was made into a compulsory subject in South India. In reaction to this,  E.V. Ramaswamy organised  anti-Hindi protests in which a plain black flag was flown. From these protests, Periyar gained a large amount of popularity and went onto be elected as the president of the Justice Party a year later. When the Justice Party was rebranded as the Dravida Kazhagam in 1944, the party adopted its official flag. The design features red circle with a black background with the color black representing "the deprivations and the indignities that the Dravidians had to face under the strict Hindu religion" while red represented "the tireless efforts taken to eliminate the ignorance and blind faith among the people and to free them from any kind of mental and materialistic exploitation".

Activities
The party often adopted a hard line approach and was often involved in mass attempts to change the system outright. One such incident involved bringing Adi Dravidas into the inner sanctum sanctorum of temples and threatening Brahmin priests to recite hymns in Tamil instead of Sanskrit. During Indian independence in 1947, the party did not accept the same as Periyar viewed Independence as the transfer of power from British to the Brahmin-Bania combine who occupied all important positions. With a firm belief that caste-based reservations are the only way to empower the under-represented, they supported reservations in education and employment right from 1919. Periyar was instrumental in introducing reservation to the non-brahmins in Tamil Nadu from 1921 even before independence .

Legacy
The organization laid the foundation for further Tamil people involvement into politics. It enthused a new Tamil spirit that later on led to the formation of many parties that would eventually challenge the Indian National Congress stranglehold. Though it failed to achieve its grandiose idea of an independent Dravidian nation, it fostered a spirit of unity amongst the Dravidians, especially in opposing Hindi language in the seventies.

Dravida Kazhagam strongly rooted for the implementation of Mandal Commission report, which was later adopted by the V.P. Singh led government in 1990. It has also involved itself in the Srilankan Tamils issue and has been vocal in the support of  LTTE.

References

External links 
 Dravidar Kazhagam - official homepage of Dravidar Kazhagam

Political parties in Tamil Nadu
Dravidian movement
1938 establishments in India